The Forge of Fury is an adventure module for the 3rd edition of the Dungeons & Dragons fantasy tabletop role-playing game.

Plot summary

The Forge of Fury is a dungeon crawl, or site-based adventure, that describes the stronghold of Khundrukar. The great dwarven smith, Durgeddin the Black, founded the secret stronghold within a great cavern system two hundred years ago when he and his clan were driven from their home by a horde of orcs and trolls. The orcs discovered the location of Khundrukar, Durgeddin's home, a century ago when they captured one of Durgeddin's clansmen. The orcs raised a great army that stormed the stronghold and slew the dwarves there, allowing the stronghold's five levels to fall into ruins. Now goblins, orcs and other monsters use the ruins as a base. Legends tell of the extraordinary blades Durgeddin forged in anger, enticing the player characters to come to the ruins of Khundrukar to obtain them.

Publication history

The book was published in 2000 and written by Richard Baker, with cover art by Todd Lockwood and interior art by Dennis Cramer.

In 2017, Wizards re-released the adventure, updated to 5th Edition rules, as part of the Tales from the Yawning Portal collection.

Reception

A reviewer from Pyramid commented that the "first few pages are very good at walking new Dungeon Masters through the steps needed to properly prepare for the adventure", also noting that "like the Sunless Citadel, the main focus is on the adventure." Conversely, an RPGnet review criticized the lack of hints in the package, but praised the adventure as following "in the mold of the great classics of the first edition".

The Forge of Fury was ranked as the 12th greatest Dungeons & Dragons adventure of all time by Dungeon magazine in 2004, on the 30th anniversary of the original Dungeons & Dragons game.

Dungeon Master for Dummies lists The Forge of Fury as one of the ten best adventures from the 3rd edition.

References

External links
 RPGnet review

Dungeons & Dragons modules
Role-playing game supplements introduced in 2000